Ferran Torres García (born 29 February 2000) is a Spanish professional footballer who plays as a forward for La Liga club Barcelona and the Spain national team.

Torres began his career at Valencia, where he made his senior debut in 2017. He moved to Manchester City in 2020 and won the Premier League and the EFL Cup in the 2020–21 season. He departed for Barcelona in January 2022. He has represented Spain internationally at various youth levels, and made his debut for the senior team in 2020.

Club career

Valencia

Born in Foios, Valencian Community, Torres joined Valencia CF's youth setup in 2006, aged six. On 15 October 2016, while still a junior, he made his senior debut with the reserve team by coming on as a substitute for Grego in a 2–0 Segunda División B home loss against Mallorca B.

Torres was promoted to the B-side ahead of the 2017–18 campaign, and scored his first senior goal on 26 August 2017 by netting his team's second in a 4–1 home win over Peralada-Girona B. On 5 October, after being strongly linked to Barcelona and Real Madrid, he renewed his contract, which increased his release clause to €25 million. He was also promoted to the first team on 1 January 2018.

Torres made his first team debut on 30 November 2017, replacing fellow youth graduate Nacho Gil in a 4–1 home routing of Real Zaragoza, for the season's Copa del Rey. He made his La Liga debut on 16 December, playing the last nine minutes in a 1–2 loss at Eibar, becoming the first player born in the 2000s to play in the league. Torres made his European and Champions League debut on 23 October 2018, starting in a 1–1 draw against Young Boys. He scored his first La Liga goal on 19 January 2019, ten minutes after coming on as a substitute in a 2–1 victory against Celta Vigo. He remained on the bench as Valencia defeated Barcelona 2–1 in the 2019 Copa del Rey Final at the Estadio Benito Villamarín in Seville, on 25 May.

On 5 November 2019, Torres scored his first Champions League goal, netting his team's last goal in a 4–1 home win against Lille, becoming Valencia's youngest goalscorer in the competition. On 23 November, Torres marked his 50th appearance in La Liga for Valencia with a 2–1 away defeat against Real Betis, becoming the youngest Los Ches player to play 50 league games at the age of 19 years and 254 days, breaking a 38-year-old record of Miguel Tendillo (19 years old and 351 days).

Manchester City
On 4 August 2020, English club Manchester City confirmed the signing of Torres on a five-year contract, until 2025, for a reported transfer fee of €23 million (£20.8 million). The club later revealed that Torres had inherited the shirt number 21 previously worn by club legend David Silva, a fellow Spanish player who also arrived from Valencia. Torres made his debut in City's first game of the season, coming on as a substitute in a 3–1 away win against Wolverhampton Wanderers in the Premier League. On 30 September, Torres scored his first goal for the club, in a 3–0 away win over Burnley in the EFL Cup.

On 21 October 2020, he made his Champions League debut with Manchester City, scoring a goal in a 3–1 win against Porto. Just a week later, Torres started and scored again in the Champions League in a 0–3 victory over Olympique de Marseille, becoming the youngest Spanish player ever to score in three consecutive appearances in the competition, at 20 years and 241 days old. On 28 November, Torres scored his first league goal for City in a 5–0 home win over Burnley. On 14 May, Torres scored his first hat-trick for City in a 4–3 away league win over Newcastle United.

Having fallen out of favour during the 2021–22 season, mainly due to injury, Torres agreed a transfer to Barcelona for €55 million (plus conditional add-ons worth €10 million) in December 2021, to be completed the following month dependent on Barça selling players from their squad.

Barcelona
On 28 December 2021, both Barcelona and Manchester City confirmed that Torres had completed a permanent move to Barcelona, signing a five-year contract until June 2027, with a buyout clause of €1 billion. On 20 January 2022, Torres scored his first goal for Barcelona in a 3–2 loss against Athletic Bilbao at the end of extra time in the Copa del Rey round of 16. On 20 March 2022, he scored a goal and assisted Pierre-Emerick Aubameyang in his first El Clásico, helping Barcelona to a 4–0 away victory against the league leaders. During his first six months at the club, Torres made 25 appearances in all competitions, scoring seven goals.

Torres struggled with his form at the start of the 2022–23 season, and was often benched in favour of Ousmane Dembélé and new signings Raphinha and Robert Lewandowski. On 19 February 2023, he put on a man-of-the-match performance in a 2–0 league win over Cádiz. The following day, Torres revealed in an interview that he had "fallen into a bottomless well", and had worked with a psychologist during his form slump.

International career
Torres was a member of the Spain squad that won the 2017 UEFA European Under-17 Championship final over England, and was also a member of the squad that reached final of the 2017 FIFA U-17 World Cup later that same year, losing out to the same opponent. He was named in Spain's squad for the 2019 UEFA European Under-19 Championship in Armenia. He scored the winning penalty in the semi-final victory over France, and both goals of the 2–0 final win against reigning champions Portugal at the Vazgen Sargsyan Republican Stadium in Yerevan. He made his debut for the Spain U21 side on 6 September 2019, in a 1–0 away win over Kazakhstan in a European Championship qualifier.

Just 16 days after signing for Manchester City, Torres was called up to the senior Spain national team for the first time. He made his debut against Germany in the UEFA Nations League on 3 September 2020, playing the full 90 minutes in a 1–1 away draw and setting up a pre-assist for Spain's last minute equaliser. Three days later, he scored his first senior international goal in a 4–0 win over Ukraine. On 17 November 2020, Torres scored his first international hat-trick in a 6–0 win over Germany.

On 24 May 2021, Torres was included in Spain's 24-man squad for UEFA Euro 2020. He scored the third goal of the Euro 2020 final 16 in the 76th minute of the game against Croatia, resulting in a 5–3 victory on 28 June.

On 6 October, Torres scored both goals in Spain's 2–1 away victory over reigning European Champions Italy in the semi-finals of the 2020–21 UEFA Nations League. In the final four days later, Spain suffered a 2–1 defeat against France. With two goals, he was the joint–top scorer of the Nations League Finals, along with France's Karim Benzema and Kylian Mbappé, with the latter winning the Top Scorer Trophy due to having also provided two assists.

Style of play
Regarded as a talented and highly promising young attacking winger in the media, Torres has been described as a traditional wide midfielder, due to his work-rate and penchant for running to the touchline, although he is also capable of cutting inside towards the centre of the pitch; due to his role, nationality, and playing style, Simone Lorini has likened him to Joaquín. Torres is known in particular for his pace, creativity, technique, and his close control at speed, which enables him to take on opponents and overload the flanks, while his height, athleticism, and heading ability also make him a strong aerial presence. Although he primarily plays on the right, he is capable of playing anywhere across the attacking line. In 2018, Spanish football journalist Guillem Balagué noted that Torres "is a dribbler, fast on the wing, can play on either wing, and he has got ability and intelligence. He can also play inside if needed, so he is a modern winger." The Valencia academy director of recruitment, José Giménez, instead stated: "He's powerful, quick, steady with the ball at his feet and strong in the air. He's unpredictable. When he's running with the ball at his feet he can go on inside or outside his man because he is two-footed. He can cross, finish and shoot the football."

Personal life
In 2021, Torres began a relationship with Sira Martínez – the daughter of former Spain national head team coach Luis Enrique.

Career statistics

Club

International

Spain score listed first, score column indicates score after each Torres goal

Honours
Valencia
Copa del Rey: 2018–19

Manchester City
Premier League: 2020–21
EFL Cup: 2020–21
UEFA Champions League runner-up: 2020–21

Barcelona
Supercopa de España: 2022–23

Spain U17
UEFA European Under-17 Championship: 2017

Spain U19
UEFA European Under-19 Championship: 2019

Spain
UEFA Nations League runner-up: 2020–21

Individual
UEFA European Under-19 Championship Team of the Tournament: 2019
Manchester City Goal of the Season: 2020–21
UEFA Nations League top scorer: 2020–21
UEFA Nations League Finals Silver Boot: 2021

References

External links

Profile at the FC Barcelona website

2000 births
Living people
People from Horta Nord
Sportspeople from the Province of Valencia
Footballers from the Valencian Community
Spanish footballers
Association football wingers
Valencia CF Mestalla footballers
Valencia CF players
Manchester City F.C. players
FC Barcelona players
Segunda División B players
La Liga players
Premier League players
Spain youth international footballers
Spain under-21 international footballers
Spain international footballers
UEFA Euro 2020 players
2022 FIFA World Cup players
Spanish expatriate footballers
Expatriate footballers in England
Spanish expatriate sportspeople in England